Lake Murphy is a lake in Lane County, Oregon.

References

Murphy
Murphy
Protected areas of Lane County, Oregon
Umpqua National Forest